Cell-free DNA could refer to:
Cell-free fetal DNA
Cell-free tumour DNA
Cell-free circulating mitochondrial DNA